Mooseland is a small rural community in the Eastern Shore area of Halifax Regional Municipality, Nova Scotia, on the Mooseland Road,  northeast of Halifax. The area is known to have deposits of gold and is the site of the first gold discovery in Nova Scotia.

Mooseland is home to the Otter Ponds Demonstration Forest (www.opdf.ca), a community forest initiative on publicly owned lands that aims to demonstrate uneven aged forest management and restoration of the Acadian Forest along the Eastern Shore. The Otter Ponds forest is approximately 
1600 acres (647 hectares; 2.5 sq mi) that straddles the Tangier River and is composed of a diverse range of conifer and deciduous forests.

Communications
Postal code – B0J 2J0
Telephone exchange – 902-772

Demographics
Population – 99
Dwellings – 134
Land area –

References
Explore HRM

Communities in Halifax, Nova Scotia
General Service Areas in Nova Scotia